La Bocayna or La Bocaina is a sea strait that separates Lanzarote from Fuerteventura in the Canary Islands. The island of Lobos is situated on the southern side of the strait, close to Fuerteventura.

In the 19th century, the strait was known as a safe anchorage with a sandy bottom, which shelved gradually towards Lanzarote with depths of up to five fathoms. The shore around Lobos was less hospitable, being ‘foul and rocky’. A steady trade wind could be found in the strait, although it was blocked by the hills of Lanzarote, becalming ships that were in their lee, tacking  towards Lobos was needed to regain the wind.
 
Large breakers were observed by one ship’s captain, produced by a heavy westerly swell.

Lighthouses
The strait is marked by a number of lighthouses including  Punta Martiño on Lobos, Pechiguera at the south western end of Lanzarote, and  Tostón on the north western side of Fuerteventura.

Ferries

A high speed ferry service runs across the strait, using the catamaran Bocayna Express. The crossing time is 20 minutes. The Fred. Olsen Express line has operated the service since 2003 between Playa Blanca in Lanzarote and Corralejo in Fuerteventura.

Naviera Armas operates a competing service with its larger but slower vessel, Volcán de Tindaya, covering the same route in 35 minutes.

Open water swimming
The Travesia La Bocaina is an annual open water swimming endurance event that crosses the strait.

References

External links

Straits of Spain
Straits of the Atlantic Ocean
Geography of the Province of Las Palmas